Haedo may refer to:

 Places
 Haedo, Buenos Aires, city located in Morón Partido, Buenos Aires Province, Argentina

 People
 Eduardo Víctor Haedo (1901–1970), President of Uruguay
 Juan José Haedo (born 1981), Argentine professional road racing cyclist and former track cyclist
 Lucas Sebastián Haedo (born 1983), Argentine professional road racing cyclist
 Nelson Haedo Valdez (born 1983), Paraguayan footballer
 José María Paz (1791–1854), General Brigadier José María Paz y Haedo

 Other
 National Technological University – Haedo Regional Faculty, faculty of the Universidad Tecnológica Nacional of Argentina